Maliera Boys Secondary School is a secondary school in Yala, Siaya County, Kenya.

References 

Siaya County
High schools and secondary schools in Kenya
Boys' schools in Kenya